Fauna of the Netherlands may refer to:

 List of birds of the Netherlands
 List of mammals of the Netherlands

See also
 Outline of Netherlands